The 1929 European Rowing Championships were rowing championships held on the Bydgoszcz Regatta Course in the Polish city of Bydgoszcz in the suburb of Łęgnowo. The competition was for men only and they competed in all seven Olympic boat classes (M1x, M2x, M2-, M2+, M4-, M4+, M8+).

Medal summary

References

European Rowing Championships
Rowing
Rowing competitions in Poland
European Rowing Championships
Rowing
European Rowing Championships
Sport in Bydgoszcz
History of Bydgoszcz